The United Nations Association of Hong Kong was a political organisation formed for promoting the values of the United Nations to Hong Kong residents. It was founded by Director of Sincere Co. Ltd Ma Man-fai in 1953.

It allied with the Reform Club of Hong Kong and Hong Kong Civic Association, the two largest political groups for a further constitutional reform in Hong Kong. Ma took an even more radical approach in the Civic-Reform coalition, striving for the self-government of the Hong Kong residents.

The Association's proposal of 1961 suggested:
 the creation of Hong Kong citizenship for all long-term residents, irrespective of race or nationality, as a guarantee for voting and other civic rights, "so that every individual can voice his free opinion without fear or arbitrary action" as allowed under the still-unrepealed emergency ordinances; and
 free universal elementary and secondary schooling, "so that every citizen can more readily learn to understand and assume the responsibility of democratic government."
 elected district bodies should replace the Urban Council. The district representatives would elect a few legislative councilors as a transitional measure, preparatory to their direct election by all adults who had been resident in Hong Kong for seven years.

Elsie Elliot was once the member of the Association from 1962 to 1967. Hilton Cheong-Leen was also its member. Governors Alexander Grantham and Robert Black were the patrons of the association. Due to the association's high-profile criticism against the government, it put the government in an embarrassing position of whether to continue its patronage of the association.

In 1983, Ma Man-fai left the association after his leadership was being stripped away by another group in the association. Since then the association was absorbed into the united front of the pro-Beijing camp.

References

1953 establishments in Hong Kong
Defunct political parties in Hong Kong
Non-profit organisations based in Hong Kong
Political parties established in 1953
World Federation of United Nations Associations